Daphnella pluricarinata is a species of sea snail, a marine gastropod mollusk in the family Raphitomidae.

Description
The length of the shell attains 7.5 mm.

The shell is encircled by numerous sharp keels. The interstices are longitudinally striate. The sinus is rather large. The color of the shell is whitish, stained with streaks of orange-brown.

Distribution
This marine species occurs off the Philippines.

References

 Reeve, L.A. 1845. Monograph of the genus Pleurotoma. pls 20–33 in Reeve, L.A. (ed). Conchologia Iconica. London : L. Reeve & Co. Vol. 1.

External links
 

pluricarinata
Gastropods described in 1845